Navarra (F85) is the fifth of the six Spanish-built s, based on the American  design, of the Spanish Navy.

Construction and career 
Laid down on 15 April 1991, and launched on 23 October 1992, Navarra was commissioned in service on 27 May 1994.

The ship features a series of improvements to her previous sisters, with a new Meroka mod 2B CIWS, and upgraded fire control systems with Mk.92 mod6 CORT (Coherent Receiver Transmitter) and SPS-49(v)5 radar instead of previous (v)4.

All of these Spanish frigates have the length of the later Oliver Hazard Perry frigates, and have a wider beam than the US Navy design, and therefore able to carry more top weight. Fin stabilizers are fitted.
On 9 December 2002, Navarra intercepted the unflagged freighter So San several hundred miles southeast of Yemen at the request of the United States government as part of Operation Enduring Freedom – Horn of Africa. The frigate fired across So Sans bow after the freighter ignored hails and attempted to evade the frigate. The freighter's crew was North Korean; 23 containers containing 15 complete Scud ballistic missiles, 15 high-explosive warheads, and 23 nitric acid containers were found on board. Yemen claimed ownership of the shipment and protested the interception and U.S. officials released the vessel after receiving assurances that the missiles would not be transferred to a third party.

On 23 March 2010, she sank a Somali pirate mothership lifeboat and captured two skiffs, after private security forces successfully defended  from a pirate attack. The six suspected pirates were later released, when the master and crew of Almezaan refused to testify.

In November 2016, while patrolling off the Libyan coast as part of the EUNAVFOR's Operation Sophia, the frigate recovered 227 migrants from inflatable boats in the Mediterranean Sea.

Gallery

Other units of class

See also
Action of 25 March 2010

References

Ships of the Spanish Navy
1992 ships
Santa María-class frigates